Israel Frederick Fischer (August 17, 1858 – March 16, 1940) was a United States representative from New York, a judge and Presiding Judge of the United States Customs Court and a member and President of the Board of General Appraisers.

Education and career

Born on August 17, 1858, in New York City, New York, Fischer attended the public schools and Cooper Institute (now Cooper Union) in New York City and moved to Brooklyn, New York in September 1887. He was employed as a clerk in a law office, where he read law and was admitted to the bar in 1879. He entered private practice in New York City from 1880 to 1895. He was a member of the executive committee of the Republican state committee from 1888 to 1890.

Congressional service

Fischer was elected as a Republican from New York's 4th congressional district to the United States House of Representatives of the 54th and 55th United States Congresses, serving from March 4, 1895, to March 3, 1899. He was an unsuccessful candidate for reelection in 1898 to the 56th United States Congress.

Federal judicial service

Fischer received a recess appointment from President William McKinley on May 2, 1899, to a seat on the Board of General Appraisers vacated by member Ferdinand N. Shurtleff. He was nominated to the same position by President McKinley on December 15, 1899. He was confirmed by the United States Senate on January 17, 1900, and received his commission on January 22, 1900. He served as President from 1902 to 1905. Fischer was reassigned by operation of law to the United States Customs Court on May 28, 1926, to a new Associate Justice seat (Judge from June 17, 1930) authorized by 44 Stat. 669. He served as Chief Justice (Presiding Judge from June 17, 1930) from 1927 to 1932. His service terminated on March 31, 1932, due to his retirement. He was succeeded by Judge Frederick W. Dallinger.

Other service and death

Fischer was a delegate to the International Customs Congress held in New York City in 1903. He died on March 16, 1940, in New York City. He was interred in Maimonides Cemetery in Brooklyn.

See also
 List of Jewish members of the United States Congress

References

Sources

 
 

1858 births
1940 deaths
Judges of the United States Customs Court
Politicians from New York City
Members of the Board of General Appraisers
Jewish members of the United States House of Representatives
United States Article I federal judges appointed by William McKinley
Republican Party members of the United States House of Representatives from New York (state)
United States federal judges admitted to the practice of law by reading law
Lawyers from New York City